Bolesław Borys Borysiuk (born 1 May 1948 in Jałowiec) is a Polish politician. He was elected to the Sejm on 25 September 2005, getting 8,256 votes in 6 Lublin district as a candidate from Samoobrona Rzeczpospolitej Polskiej list.

See also
Members of Polish Sejm 2005-2007

External links
Bolesław Borysiuk - parliamentary page - includes declarations of interest, voting record, and transcripts of speeches.

Members of the Polish Sejm 2005–2007
Self-Defence of the Republic of Poland politicians
1948 births
Living people